The teams were divided into three groups of eight teams each. The first two teams of each group qualified to the playoffs and the first two teams qualified to the Second Division and replaced the relegated teams. The last two teams were submitted to the playoffs to decide which two of these five teams were relegated to the Fourth Division.

Regular season

Group 1

Group 2

Group 3

Promotion Group

Relegation Group

Lebanese Third Division seasons
Lebanon
3